Novogurovka is a rural locality (a village) in Tryapinsky Selsoviet, Aurgazinsky District, Bashkortostan, Russia. The population was 93 as of 2010. There is 1 street.

Geography 
Novogurovka is located 26 km northeast of Tolbazy (the district's administrative centre) by road. Tryapino is the nearest rural locality.

References 

Rural localities in Aurgazinsky District